The 1940 Texas gubernatorial election was held on November 5, 1940.

Incumbent Democratic Governor W. Lee O'Daniel defeated Republican nominee George C. Hopkins with 94.42% of the vote.

Nominations

Democratic primary
The Democratic primary election was held on July 27, 1940. By winning over 50% of the vote, O'Daniel avoided a run-off.

Candidates
R. P. Condron
Arlon Barton "Cyclone" Davis, son of James Harvey "Cyclone" Davis
Miriam A. Ferguson, former Governor
Harry Hines, incumbent Highway Commissioner
W. Lee O'Daniel, incumbent Governor
Jerry Sadler, incumbent Railroad Commissioner
Ernest O. Thompson, incumbent Railroad Commissioner and unsuccessful candidate for Democratic nomination for Governor in 1938

Withdrawn
Albert L. Derden, State Representative

Results

Republican nomination

The Republican state convention was held at Beaumont on August 13, 1940.

George C. Hopkins, businessman, was nominated for Governor.

General election

Candidates
W. Lee O'Daniel, Democratic
George C. Hopkins, Republican
Ben H. Lauderdale, Communist, nominee for Agriculture Commissioner in 1938

Results

References

Bibliography
 
 

1940
Texas
Gubernatorial
November 1940 events